Amelia Quirk (born 18 December 1999) is a British long-distance runner. She competed in the senior women's race at the 2019 IAAF World Cross Country Championships held in Aarhus, Denmark. She finished in 79th place.

In 2017, she competed in the junior women's race at the IAAF World Cross Country Championships held in Kampala, Uganda. She did not finish her race.

In 2019, she competed in the women's 5000 metres event at the European Athletics U23 Championships held in Gävle, Sweden. She finished in 12th place. The following year, she won the bronze medal in the women's 5000 metres event at the 2020 British Athletics Championships held in Manchester, United Kingdom.

In 2021, she competed in the women's 3000 metres event at the European Athletics Indoor Championships held in Toruń, Poland.

References

External links 
 

Living people
1999 births
Place of birth missing (living people)
British female long-distance runners
British female cross country runners
People from Tameside (district)
21st-century British women